Eidophasia vanella is a moth of the  family Plutellidae. It is found in North America from Alberta to California.

The length of the forewings is 7.5–8.5 mm.

The larvae feed on various plants, including Vicia gigantea and Osmorhiza species.

References

Moths described in 1881
Plutellidae